"Los Angeloser" is the first single from Meat Loaf's 2010 album Hang Cool Teddy Bear. It was released in April 2010 in various countries. The US digital retail release was on 20 April. On week 16 the song entered the UK Singles Chart at No. 107.

Background
The song is written by James Michael who has written a number of songs for Meat Loaf. Michael had previously recorded the song with his own vocals in 2009.

The B-side "Boneyard" which features Pearl Aday was written by Tom Hambridge, and was originally recorded by Hambridge for his Balderdash album in 2000.

Video
The video for "Los Angeloser", directed by Andy Morahan, was released on 18 March 2010. The video is about a soldier who has been wounded and sees his life flashing forward into different scenarios of what his life could become.

Track listing
 "Los Angeloser" (James Michael) – 4:09
 "Boneyard" with Pearl Aday (Tom Hambridge) – 5:02

References

External links
 HangCoolTeddyBear.com
 

2010 songs
2010 singles
Meat Loaf songs
Mercury Records singles
James Michael songs
Music videos directed by Andy Morahan
Roadrunner Records singles
Song recordings produced by Rob Cavallo
Songs written by James Michael